Bernard Theodore Espelage, O.F.M. (February 16, 1892—February 19, 1971) was an American prelate of the Roman Catholic Church. He was the first bishop of the Diocese of Gallup in New Mexico, serving from 1940 until 1969.

Biography

Early life 
Bernard Espelage was born in Cincinnati, Ohio, to Bernard and Clara (née Schottelkotte) Espelage. He received his early education at parochial schools and Franciscan seminaries. He was invested with the Franciscan habit on August 15, 1910, and made his profession as a member of the Franciscan Order on August 15, 1911.

Priesthood 
Espelage was ordained to the priesthood in Oldenburg, Indiana, on May 16, 1918. He then served as a curate in Roswell, New Mexico, for a year before becoming chancellor of the Archdiocese of Santa Fe in 1919. In 1926, he earned a Licentiate of Canon Law from the Catholic University of America in Washington, D.C. Espelage served as rector of the Cathedral of St. Francis of Assisi (1934-1939) and then returned to Oldenburg, serving as pastor of Holy Family Parish (1939-1940).

Bishop of Gallup 
On July 20, 1940, Pope Pius XII appointed Espelage as the first bishop of the Diocese of Gallup. He received his episcopal consecration on October 9, 1940. from Archbishop John T. McNicholas, with Bishop Joseph H. Albers and Archbishop Joseph Ritter serving as co-consecrators. Espelage attended all four sessions of the Second Vatican Council in Rome between 1962 and 1965. During his 29-year-long tenure, he increased the number of Catholics from 30,000 to 79,260; priests from 32 to 108; and parishes from 17 to 53.

Retirement and legacy 
Espelage retired as Bishop of Gallup on August 25, 1969; he was named titular bishop of Penafiel by Pope Paul VI on the same date. He later died at age 79.

References

1892 births
1971 deaths
Catholic University of America alumni
Religious leaders from Cincinnati
Participants in the Second Vatican Council
Roman Catholic Archdiocese of Santa Fe
Roman Catholic Diocese of Gallup
20th-century Roman Catholic bishops in the United States